Edoardo Charbon (born 1964 in Sorengo, Switzerland) is a Swiss electrical engineer. He is a professor of quantum engineering at EPFL (École Polytechnique Fédérale de Lausanne) and the head of the Laboratory of Advanced Quantum Architecture (AQUA) at the School of Engineering.

Career 
Charbon was born and raised in Ticino, in the southern part of Switzerland. He received a Diploma in electrical engineering in 1988 from ETH Zurich. He then pursued first a master's degree in electrical and computer engineering from the University of California, San Diego in 1991, before joining the University of California, Berkeley, where he graduated with a PhD in electrical engineering and computer sciences (EECS) with a thesis on analog and mixed-signal design automation in 1995. Until 2000, he stayed affiliated at University of California, Berkeley, while working at the company Cadence Design Systems as the architect of intellectual property protection projects. In 2000, he joined the company Canesta Inc. as chief architect to lead the development of wireless 3D CMOS image sensors.

In 2002, Charbon joined the faculty of EPFL, where he has since 2015 been full professor of electrical engineering  as well as the head of Laboratory of Advanced Quantum Architecture at EPFL's School of Engineering.

From 2008 to 2016, he was also professor at the Chair of VLSI design at Delft University of Technology. He is a distinguished visiting scholar of the W. M. Keck Institute for Space at California Institute of Technology (Caltech), and a fellow of the Kavli Institute of Nanoscience at Delft University of Technology.

Research 

Charbon's research is focused on the multi-disciplinary boundaries between physics and electrical engineering, and is investeted both in ground research as well as the development of hardware and software systems. He investigates and develops cryogenic electronics, near and short wave infrared single photon avalanche devices (SPAD), light detecting and ranging (LIDAR) applications, microscopy, positron emission tomography (PET) components, quantum random number generators (QRNG), and super conducting devices.

Charbon lead and participated in a row of interenational and interdisciplinary research projects such as Megaframe (2006-2009), SPADNet (2010-2014), EndoTOFPET-US (2011-2015), Polis (2014-2018), MOS-QUITO (2016-2019), Qu3D (2019-2022), SuperMaMa (2020-2022).

He is (co-)author of over 400 papers and two books, and he holds 23 patents.

His research has been featured in several news outlets such as Mirage News, Link Magazine, EE Times, New Scientist, Liechtensteiner Vaterland, and Les Nummeriques.

Distinctions 
He is the co-recipient of the best European paper award, IEEE International Solid-State Circuits Conference in 2021.

He is the recipient of the Venture Kick Awards in 2014 and 2020.

He is the recipient of the Europe's Best Academic Research Team Award in 2019 and the co-recipient of the best paper award, International Image Sensor Society (with Preethi Padmanabhan) in the same year.

He is the co-recipient of the best paper award, IEEE Nuclear Science Symposium (with Andrada Muntean in 2018 and with Francesco Gramuglia in 2020) and Physics and Applications of Superconducting Nanowire SPDs Conference (with Simone Frasca) in 2018.

He is the co-recipient of the best paper award, IEEE IWASI (with Fabio Sebastiano and Andrei Vladimirescu) in 2017.

He is a distinguished lecturer of the IEEE Photonics Society, a fellow of the IEEE (Institute of Electrical and Electronics Engineers), and a member of the Electron Devices Society (EDS), QuTech, and the Kavli Institute of Nanoscience Delft (KIND).

He is the founder of several start-up companies such as Fastree3D, and Pi Imaging Technology.

Selected works

References

External links 
 
 Website of the Laboratory of Advanced Quantum Architecture (AQUA)

1964 births
Living people
ETH Zurich alumni
University of California, San Diego alumni
University of California, Berkeley alumni
Academic staff of the École Polytechnique Fédérale de Lausanne
Swiss electrical engineers